Koo Chen-fu (6 January 1917 – 3 January 2005), also known as C.F. Koo, was a Taiwanese businessman and diplomat. He led the Koos Group of companies from 1940 until his death. As a chairman of the Straits Exchange Foundation (SEF), Koo arranged the first direct talks between Taiwan and mainland China since 1949 and served as Taiwan's negotiator in both the 1993 and 1998 Wang-Koo summit.

He was also a film producer and produced a number of Taiwanese films between 1973 and 1982, such as Love, Love, Love (1974), Eight Hundred Heroes (1975), Heroes of the Eastern Skies (1977), The Coldest Winter in Peking (1981), and Attack Force Z (1982).

Early life
Born in northern Taiwan into a wealthy family headed by his father Koo Hsien-jung, Koo attended Taihoku Imperial University (now National Taiwan University). He inherited a substantial fortune and a business upon his father's death in 1937. Koo graduated in 1940 and pursued a graduate degree in Japan.

Koo was jailed in 1946 for 19 months on treason charges for helping Japanese. After his release, he took refuge in Hong Kong and only returned to Taiwan in 1949 to marry his wife, . He focused on running Koos Group as well as on his political career that led to his elevation to the central committee of Kuomintang.

SEF Chairmanship
Koo was the founding chairman of the Straits Exchange Foundation (SEF). On 16 December 1991, a little over ten months after the establishment of the SEF, the authorities of People's Republic of China (PRC) set up the Association for Relations Across the Taiwan Straits (ARATS), with Wang Daohan as its chairman. The following year Koo and Wang held preliminary talks in Hong Kong that resulted in the so-called "1992 Consensus" and facilitated negotiations of practical matters. However, the content and the existence of this "1992 consensus" is widely disputed. In 2001, Koo publicly affirmed that the meeting did not result in a consensus on the issue of "one-China". In April 1993, Koo and Wang met in Singapore to hold the first formal discussions between Taipei and Beijing since 1949. The two met again in Shanghai in 1998. On 18 October 1998, Koo met Jiang Zemin, General Secretary of the Communist Party of China, in Beijing, in what was then the highest-level talks yet held between the two sides. The talks were called off by Beijing in 1999 after ROC President Lee Teng-hui proposed his two-states theory.

Death
Koo Chen-fu died of renal cancer on the morning of 3 January 2005 at the age of 87.

References

External links

1917 births
2005 deaths
Deaths from cancer in Taiwan
Hokkien businesspeople
Deaths from kidney cancer
Koo family of Lukang
National Taiwan University alumni
University of Tokyo alumni
Senior Advisors to President Lee Teng-hui
Businesspeople from Taipei
Taiwanese people of Hoklo descent
Politicians of the Republic of China on Taiwan from Taipei
Taiwanese film producers
Kuomintang politicians in Taiwan
Senior Advisors to President Chen Shui-bian
Taiwanese prisoners and detainees
Prisoners and detainees of Taiwan